Mark Miller (born October 24, 1962) is an American professional off-road racer, competing in both cars and on motorcycles.

Miller was born in Phoenix, Arizona, lives both in Arizona and Colorado, and has two sons, Nick and Sam.  His non-racing profession was investing, and his hobbies include enduro motorcycling, mountain bikes, fly fishing and snowmobiling.

He has competed in SCORE, NASCAR, Rally, Rally-Raid and other classes and competitions.  In April 2008 he competed in the 2008 Central Europe Rally, the first in the new series of events created by the promoters of the Dakar Rally.  Miller was competing for the Volkswagen factory team in a diesel Touareg (#206) but crashed out of the competition on the first day.

Before the 2010 Dakar Rally Sports Illustrated published this article

After Stage 5 of the 2010 Dakar Rally AutoSport wrote this article about Mark Miller winning the stage 

In 2011 he published a book about his life, Dash-The Dakar Rally, Life and Happiness.

Sporting career highlights
1999 - AMA 4-stroke National Enduro Champion, Silver Medal Portugal ISDE
2000 - 1st Trophy Tuck Nevada 2000, 3rd Trophy Truck Baja 2000 
2002 - 1st Trophy Tuck Baja 500
2003 - 1st place Trophy Truck Baja 1000, Baja 500, Parker 400
2004 - 1st place Trophy Truck Baja 1000
2006 - 5th place Dakar Rally (Volkswagen) Race Touareg
2007 - 4th place Dakar Rally (Volkswagen) Race Touareg
2008 - 2nd Place Rally dos Sertões (Volkswagen) Race Touareg
2009 - 2nd place Dakar Rally     Silk Way Rally Russia 2nd Place
2010 - 3rd place Dakar Rally
2011 - 6th place 2011 Dakar Rally

References

Volkswagen Motorsport Information: Central Europe Rally 2008 press book published by Volkswagen Motorsport GmbH Communications 2008

1962 births
Living people
Sportspeople from Phoenix, Arizona
American motorcycle racers
Enduro riders
Off-road racing drivers
Off-road motorcycle racers
Racing drivers from Phoenix, Arizona

Volkswagen Motorsport drivers
Dakar Rally drivers